John Floyd Holt (January 20, 1915 in Pittsburgh, Pennsylvania – July 22, 1996) was a pioneer in the field of pediatric radiology.  He was considered a "radiologic authority on neurofibromatosis, or Recklinghausen disease."

Education
In 1938, Holt completed the six-year B.S. and medical degree program at the University of Pittsburgh and the next year, went to the University of Michigan for his residency.

Career
Holt was the first director of pediatric radiology at C.S. Mott Children's Hospital.

Publications
Radiology for Medical Students "one of the seminal textbooks of the field". It was first published in 1947. The fourth edition was published in 1965.

Personal life
Holt died in his sleep, at his home in Ann Arbor.

References

1915 births
1996 deaths
Writers from Pittsburgh
American radiologists
University of Pittsburgh alumni
American male non-fiction writers
American textbook writers
Scientists from Pittsburgh
20th-century American male writers